This is a discography of Götterdämmerung,  the fourth of the four operas that make up Der Ring des Nibelungen (The Ring of the Nibelung), by Richard Wagner, which received its premiere at the Bayreuth Festspielhaus on 17 August 1876.

Recordings

References

Opera discographies
Der Ring des Nibelungen
Operas by Richard Wagner